Philippe Thys (8 October 1889 – 16 January 1971) was a Belgian cyclist and three times winner of the Tour de France.

Professional career
In 1910, Thys won Belgium's first national cyclo-cross championship. The following year he won the Circuit Français Peugeot, followed by stage races from Paris to Toulouse and Paris to Turin. He then turned professional to ride the Tour de France.

Thys won the Tour in 1913 despite breaking his bicycle fork, and needing to find a bicycle shop to mend it. The repair induced a 10-minute penalty, but he won with a lead of just under nine minutes. Thys took the stage and the race lead when Eugène Christophe broke his fork on the way to Luchon. Marcel Buysse overtook him in the results the following day. Another broken fork on the way to Nice gave Thys the lead again but drama continued when he fell on the penultimate stage from Longwy to Dunkirk. Despite being knocked out and being penalised for help from teammates to repair his bike, he won 8 minutes and 37 seconds ahead of Gustave Garrigou, with Buysse third.

In 1914, he took his first stage victory, to Le Havre, holding the race from start to finish despite a 30-minute penalty for an unauthorised wheel change on the penultimate stage. His victory looked uncertain, his lead cut to less than two minutes ahead of Henri Pélissier. Ironically, on the final stage from Dunkirk to Paris, the Frenchman's supporters along the route who were expecting victory over the Belgian were the reason he was prevented from launching a breakaway. He won the stage but Thys finished on his wheel to win the Tour.

In 1917, Thys won Paris–Tours and the Giro di Lombardia. In 1918, he also won the second and last Tours–Paris. After World War I, Thys won the Tour a third and final time in 1920. He led from the second stage, Henri Desgrange writing "France is not unaware that, without the war, the crack rider from Anderlecht would be celebrating not his third Tour, but his fifth or sixth".

Not until 1955 did Louison Bobet equal Thys's record, and not until 1963 did Jacques Anquetil break it with four wins. Thys also rode in the 1922 Tour, winning five stages, and in the 1924 Tour, winning two stages.

Thys was one of a generation of cyclists whose careers were disrupted by the First World War. After retiring, he recalled that he had been asked by his manager, Alphonse Baugé, to wear a yellow jersey as leader of the Tour, although that distinction is more commonly attributed to Eugène Christophe.

Career achievements

Major results

1910
National cyclo-cross championship
1913
1913 Tour de France – 1st overall and 1 stage win
1914
1914 Tour de France – 1st overall and 1 stage win
1917
Giro di Lombardia
Paris–Tours
1918
Paris–Tours (see race notes for details)
1920
1920 Tour de France – 1st overall and 4 stage wins
1921
Critérium des As
1922
1922 Tour de France – 5 stage wins
1924
1924 Tour de France – 2 stage wins (one tied with Théophile Beeckman)

Grand Tour results

References

External links
 
 Official Tour de France results for Philippe Thys.

Belgian male cyclists
Tour de France winners
Belgian Tour de France stage winners
Cyclo-cross cyclists
1889 births
1971 deaths
People from Anderlecht
Belgian cyclo-cross champions
Cyclists from Brussels
20th-century Belgian people